The 1979 Romika Cup was a men's Grand Prix Tennis Circuit tennis tournament held at the MTTC Iphitos in Munich, West Germany. It was the 63rd edition of the tournament which was held from 22 May through 27 May 1979. First-seeded Manuel Orantes won the singles title, his second at the event after 1976.

Finals

Singles

 Manuel Orantes defeated  Wojciech Fibak 6–3, 6–2, 6–4
 It was Orantes's only title of the year and the 52nd of his career.

Doubles

 Wojciech Fibak /  Tom Okker defeated  Jürgen Fassbender /  Jean-Louis Haillet 7–6, 7–5
 It was Fibak's 6th title of the year and the 44th of his career. It was Okker's 4th title of the year and the 85th of his career.

References

External links 
 ATP – tournament profile
 ITF – tournament edition details
 Official website

Romika Cup
 
Bavarian International Tennis Championships
Romika Cup
Romika Cup
German